Fiesta Buena is a multilingual album by French DJ of Algerian descent following his great success with "Zumba He Zumba Ha". The album contains songs using various languages: French, Spanish, Arabic and local North African dialects, creole, a French dialect spoken in Martinique and Guadeloupe. Most of the songs are written in collaboration between Mounir Belkhir, Luis Guisao and Soldat Jahman.

It was released on 1 October 2012 with DJ Mam's own record label Mam's Prod and by Space Party, with exclusive licence for distribution to Wagram Music.

Artists
Producer DJ Mam's collaborated in these recordings with a great number of artists.

Major collaborations

Other artists (in alphabetical order)

Track listing

Charts

References

2012 albums